The Beothuk ( or ; also spelled Beothuck) were a group of indigenous people who lived on the island of Newfoundland.

Beginning around AD 1500, the Beothuk culture formed. This appeared to be the most recent cultural manifestation of peoples who first migrated from Labrador to present-day Newfoundland around AD 1. The ancestors of this group had three earlier cultural phases, each lasting approximately 500 years.

Description 
The Beothuk lived throughout the island of Newfoundland, mostly in the Notre Dame and Bonavista Bay areas. Estimates vary as to the number of Beothuk at the time of contact with Europeans. Beothuk researcher Ingeborg Marshall has argued that a valid understanding of Beothuk history and culture is directly impacted by how and by whom historical records were created, pointing to the ethnocentric nature of European accounts as inherently unreliable. Scholars of the 19th and early 20th century estimated about 2,000 individuals at the time of European contact in the 15th century. There is purportedly good evidence that there may have been no more than 500 to 700 people. They lived in independent, self-sufficient, extended family groups of 30 to 55 people.

Like many other hunter-gatherers, they appear to have had band leaders but probably not more formal "chiefs". They lived in conical dwellings known as mamateeks, which were fortified for the winter season. These were constructed by arranging poles in a circle, tying them at the top, and covering them with birch bark. The floors were dug with hollows used for sleeping. A fireplace was made at the centre.

During spring, the Beothuk used red ochre to paint not only their bodies but also their houses, canoes, weapons, household appliances, and musical instruments. This practice led Europeans to refer to them as "Red Indians". The use of ochre had great cultural significance. The decorating was done during an annual multi-day spring celebration. It designated tribal identity; for example, decorating newborn children was a way to welcome them into the tribe. Forbidding a person to wear ochre was a form of punishment.

Their main sources of food were caribou, salmon, and seals, augmented by harvesting other animal and plant species. The Beothuk followed the seasonal migratory habits of their principal quarry.

The Beothuk are also known to have made a pudding out of tree sap and the dried yolk of the eggs of the great auk. They preserved surplus food for use during winter, trapped various fur-bearing animals, and worked their skins for warm clothing. The fur side was worn next to the skin, to trap air against a person's body.

Beothuk canoes were made of caribou or seal skin, and the bow of the canoe was stiffened with spruce bark.

The Beothuk followed elaborate burial practices. After wrapping the bodies in birch bark, they buried the dead in isolated locations. In one form, a shallow grave was covered with a rock pile. At other times they laid the body on a scaffold, or placed it in a burial box, with the knees folded. The survivors placed offerings at burial sites to accompany the dead, such as figurines, pendants, and replicas of tools.

European exploration 

About 1000 AD, Norse explorers encountered indigenous people in northern Newfoundland, who may have been ancestors of the later Beothuk, or Dorset inhabitants of Labrador and Newfoundland. The Norse called them skrælingjar ("skraelings"). Beginning in 1497, with the arrival of the Italian explorer John Cabot, sailing under the auspices of King Henry VII, waves of European explorers and settlers had more contacts. Venetian at the court of Henry VIII of England, Lorenzo Pasqualigo's letters from 1509 in Labrador quote him commenting on the impression of The Beothuk people, "On this account his Majesty here intends to draw great advantage from the said land as well by the wood for ships, of which they are in want, as by the men, who will be excellent for labour and the best slaves that have hitherto been obtained." Portuguese Explorer, Jaoa Fernandez writes how in Labrador, Corte-Real "seized sixty Indians as slaves, and in September divided his expedition. Two ships he sent home with the captives to Portugal, and they arrived safely in October."

Unlike some other indigenous groups, the Beothuk tried to avoid contact with Europeans; they moved inland as European settlements grew. The Beothuk visited their former camps only to pick up metal objects. They would also collect any tools, shelters, and building materials left by the European fishermen who had dried and cured their catch before taking it to Europe at the end of the season. Contact between Europeans and the Beothuk was usually negative for one side, with a few exceptions like John Guy's party in 1612. Settlers and the Beothuk competed for natural resources such as salmon, seals, and birds. In the interior, fur trappers established traplines, disrupted the caribou hunts, and ransacked Beothuk stores, camps and supplies. The Beothuk would steal traps to reuse the metals, and steal from the homes and shelters of European settlers and sometimes ambush them. These encounters led to enmity and mutual violence. With superior arms technology, the settlers generally had the upper hand in hunting and warfare. (Unlike other indigenous peoples, the Beothuk appeared to have had no interest in adopting firearms.)

Intermittently, Europeans attempted to improve relations with the Beothuk. Examples included expeditions by naval lieutenants George Cartwright in 1768 and David Buchan in 1811. Cartwright's expedition was commissioned by Governor Hugh Palliser; he found no Beothuk, but brought back important cultural information.

Governor John Duckworth commissioned Buchan's expedition. Although undertaken for information gathering, this expedition ended in violence. Buchan's party encountered several Beothuk near Red Indian Lake. After an initially friendly reception, Buchan left two of his men behind with the Beothuk. The next day, he found them murdered and mutilated. According to the Beothuk Shanawdithit's later account, the marines were killed when one refused to give up his jacket and both ran away.

Causes of starvation 
The Beothuks avoided Europeans in Newfoundland by moving inland from their traditional settlements. First, they emigrated to different coastal areas of Newfoundland, places the Europeans did not have fish-camps, but they were over-run. Then, they emigrated to inland Newfoundland. The Beothuks' main food sources were caribou, fish, and seals; their emigration deprived them of two of these. This led to the over-hunting of caribou, leading to a decrease in the caribou population in Newfoundland. The Beothuks emigrated from their traditional land and lifestyle into ecosystems unable to support them, causing under-nourishment and, eventually, starvation.

Extinction 

Population estimates of Beothuks remaining at the end of the first decade of the 19th century vary widely, from about 150 up to 3,000. Information about the Beothuk was based on accounts by the woman Shanawdithit, who told about the people who "wintered on the Exploits River or at Red Indian Lake and resorted to the coast in Notre Dame Bay". References in records also noted some survivors on the Northern Peninsula in the early 19th century.

During the colonial period, the Beothuk people allegedly endured territorial pressure from Native groups: Mi'kmaq migrants from Cape Breton Island, and Inuit from Labrador. "The Beothuk were unable to procure sufficient subsistence within the areas left to them." This is, however, disputed by many historians and has since been come to be known as the "Mercenary Myth". Beothuk numbers dwindled rapidly due to a combination of factors, including:
 loss of access to important food sources, from the competition with European settlers;
 infectious diseases to which they had no immunity, such as smallpox, introduced by European contact;
 endemic tuberculosis (TB), which weakened tribal members;
 violent encounters with trappers and settlers.

By 1829, with the death of Shanawdithit, the people were declared extinct.

Oral histories suggest a few Beothuk survived around the region of the Exploits River, Twillingate, Newfoundland; and Labrador; and formed unions with European colonists, Inuit and Mi'kmaq. Some families from Twillingate claim descent from the Beothuk people of the early 19th century.

In 1910, a 75-year-old indigenous woman named Santu Toney, claimed she was the daughter of a Mi'kmaq mother and a Beothuk father. She recorded a song in the Beothuk language for the American anthropologist Frank Speck. He was doing field studies in the area. She said her father taught her the song.

Since Santu Toney was born about 1835, this may be evidence some Beothuk people survived beyond the death of Shanawdithit in 1829. Contemporary researchers tried to transcribe the song, as well as improve the recording by current methods. Native groups learned the song to use in celebrations of tradition.

Genocide 

Historians sometimes disagree over what constitutes genocide, and their disagreements may be based on political agendas.

If a campaign of genocide occurred, it was explicitly without official sanction no later than 1769, any such action thereafter being in violation of Governor John Byron's proclamation criminalizing violence against the Beothuk, as well as the subsequent Proclamation issued by Governor John Holloway on July 30, 1807, which prohibited mistreatment of the Beothuk and offered a reward for any information on such mistreatment.

Notable Beothuk captives 
Several Beothuk were captured by settlers from the Newfoundland Colony during the early 19th century.

Demasduit 

Demasduit was a Beothuk woman, about 23 years old at the time she was captured by a party led by the fisherman John Peyton Sr. near Red Indian Lake in March 1819.

The governor of the Newfoundland Colony was seeking to encourage trade and end hostilities with the Beothuk. He approved an expedition, to be led by the Scottish explorer David Buchan, to recover a boat and other fishing gear foraged by the Beothuk. Buchan was accompanied by two soldiers; the Beothuk mistakenly thought Buchan had hostile intentions and killed and decapitated the soldiers accompanying him.

In 1819, an armed party led by Peyton Sr, totaling about nine men (including Peyton Jr.), came upon a Beothuk camp looking for stolen fishing gear. The Beothuk scattered, although Demasduit was unable to escape and begged for mercy, exposing her breasts to show she was a nursing mother with child. Her husband, Nonosbawsut, confronted Peyton Sr. and his party, attempting to negotiate for the release of his wife. Peyton Sr. refused and a scuffle broke out between him and Nonosbawsut, resulting in the death of the latter. Peyton Sr. and his party took Demasduit to Twillingate, with her baby dying before they reached the settlement.

The settlers at the Newfound Colony named Demasduit Mary March after the month she was taken. Government agents took her to St. John's, Newfoundland. The colonial government hoped to make Demasduit comfortable while she was living in the colony so she might be a bridge between them and the Beothuk. Demasduit learned some English, and taught the settlers about 200 words of the Beothuk language. In January 1820, Demasduit was released to rejoin her people, but she died of tuberculosis on the voyage to Notre Dame Bay.

Shanawdithit 

Shanawdithit was Demasduit's niece and the last known full-blooded Beothuk. In April 1823, she was in her early twenties. She, her mother, and sister sought food and help from a white trapper. They were starving. The three were taken to St. John's, but her mother and sister died of tuberculosis, an epidemic among the First Nations. Called Nancy April by the settlers, Shanawdithit lived for several years in the home of John Peyton Jr. as a servant.

The explorer William Cormack founded the Beothuk Institute in 1827 to foster friendly dealings with the Beothuk and support their culture. His expeditions found Beothuk artifacts but he also learned the society was dying out. Learning of Shanawdithit, in the winter 1828–1829, Cormack brought her to his centre so he could learn from her. He drew funds from his institute to pay for her support.

Shanawdithit made ten drawings for Cormack, some of which showed parts of the island, and others illustrated Beothuk implements and dwellings, along with Beothuk notions and myths. As she explained her drawings, she taught Cormack Beothuk vocabulary. She told him there were far fewer Beothuk than twenty years previously. To her knowledge, at the time she was taken, only a dozen Beothuk survived. Despite medical care from the doctor William Carson, Shanawdithit died of tuberculosis in St. John's on 6 June 1829. At the time, there was no European cure for the disease.

Archaeology 

The area around eastern Notre Dame Bay, on the northeast coast of Newfoundland, contains numerous archeological sites containing material from indigenous cultures. One of them is the Boyd's Cove site. At the foot of a bay, it is protected by a maze of islands sheltering it from waves and winds. The site was found in 1981 during an archeological survey to locate Beothuk sites to study their artifacts for insight into Beothuk culture.

Records were too limited to answer questions about the people. Few record-keeping Europeans contacted the Beothuk, and information about them is limited. By contrast, peoples such as the Huron or the Mi'kmaq interacted with the French missionaries, who studied and taught them, and had extensive trade with French, Dutch and English merchants - all of whom made records of their encounters.

References document a Beothuk presence in the region of Notre Dame Bay in the last half of the 18th and early part of the 19th century. Previous archaeological surveys and amateur finds indicate it was likely the Beothuk lived in the area prior to European encounter. Eastern Notre Dame Bay is rich in animal and fish life: seals, fish, and seabirds, and its hinterland supported large caribou herds.

Archaeologists found sixteen Aboriginal sites, ranging in age from the Maritime Archaic era (7000 BC – modern) through the Palaeo-Eskimo period, down to the Recent Indian (including the Beothuk) occupation. Two of the sites are associated with the historical Beothuk. The coarse sand, gravel, and boulders were left behind by glaciers.

The artifacts provide answers to an economic question: why did the Beothuk avoid Europeans? The interiors of four houses and their environs produced some 1,157 nails, the majority of which were forged by the Beothuk. The site's occupants manufactured some sixty-seven projectile points (most made from nails and bones). They modified nails to use as what are believed to be scrapers to remove fat from animal hides, they straightened fish hooks and adapted them as awls, they fashioned lead into ornaments, and so on. In summary, the Boyd's Cove Beothuk took debris from an early modern European fishery and fashioned materials.

Genetics 
In 2007, DNA testing was conducted on material from the teeth of Demasduit and her husband Nonosabasut, two Beothuk individuals buried in the 1820s. The results assigned them to Haplogroup X (mtDNA) and Haplogroup C (mtDNA), respectively, which are also found in current Mi'kmaq populations in Newfoundland. DNA research indicates they were solely of First Nation indigenous maternal ancestry, unlike some earlier studies suggesting an indigenous/European hybrid. However, a 2011 analysis showed although the two Beothuk and living Mi'kmaq occur in the same haplogroups, SNP differences between Beothuk and Mi'kmaq individuals indicate they were dissimilar within those groups, and a 'close-relationship' theory was not supported.

Footnotes

References 
Brown, Robert Craig, Reminiscences of James P. Howley: Selected Years. Toronto: Champlain Society Publications, 1997.
Hewson, John. "Beothuk and Algonkian: Evidence Old and New", International Journal of American Linguistics, Vol. 34, No. 2 (April 1968), pp. 85–93.
Holly, Donald H. Jr. "A Historiography of an Ahistoricity: On the Beothuk Indians", History and Anthropology, 2003, Vol. 14(2), pp. 127–140.
Holly, Donald H. Jr. "The Beothuk on the eve of their extinction", Arctic Anthropology, 2000, Vol. 37(1), pp. 79–95.
Howley, James P., The Beothucks or Red Indians, Cambridge University Press, 1918. Reprint: Prospero Books, Toronto. (2000). .

Pastore, Ralph T., Shanawdithit's People: The Archaeology of the Beothuks. Breakwater Books, St. John's, Newfoundland, 1992. .
Renouf, M. A. P. "Prehistory of Newfoundland hunter-gatherers: extinctions or adaptations?" World Archaeology, Vol. 30(3): pp. 403–420 Arctic Archaeology 1999.
Such, Peter, Vanished Peoples: The Archaic Dorset & Beothuk People of Newfoundland. NC Press, Toronto, 1978.
Tuck, James A., Ancient People of Port au Choix: The Excavation of an Archaic Indian Cemetery in Newfoundland. Institute of Social and Economic Research, Memorial University of Newfoundland, 1994.
Winter, Keith John, Shananditti: The Last of the Beothuks. J.J. Douglas Ltd., North Vancouver, B.C., 1975. .
Assiniwi, Bernard, "La saga des Béothuks". Babel, LEMÉAC, 1996.

External links 

The Beothuks, Newfoundland and Labrador Heritage.
Beothuk, Native Languages.
Ideas on CBC program about Demasduwit

 
Indigenous peoples in Atlantic Canada
Algonquian peoples
First Nations in Atlantic Canada
Culture of Newfoundland and Labrador
History of Newfoundland and Labrador
Extinct ethnic groups
Native American genocide
Extinct Native American peoples
Genocides in North America